Kargil district is one of two districts comprising Ladakh, India, with its headquarters at Kargil city. The district is bounded by the union territory of Jammu and Kashmir in the west, the Pakistani territory of Gilgit–Baltistan in the north, Ladakh's Leh district to the east, and the state of Himachal Pradesh in the south. Encompassing three historical regions known as Purig, Dras and Zanskar, the district lies to the northeast of the Great Himalayas and encompasses the majority of the Zanskar Range. Its population inhabits the river valleys of the Dras, Suru, Wakha Rong, and Zanskar. 

The district was created in 1979, when Ladakh was part of the state of Jammu and Kashmir, separating it from Leh district. In 2003, Kargil was granted a Ladakh Autonomous Hill Development Council (LAHDC). In 2019, Ladakh became a union territory, with Kargil and Leh being its joint capitals.

Shia Muslims comprise the majority of the population of the district, with Buddhists forming a significant minority, mainly inhabiting the Zanskar tehsil.

Geography 

The Kargil district lies between the crest of the Great Himalaya Range and the Indus River of Ladakh. It consists of two river valleys: the Suru River and its tributaries in the north, and the Zanskar River and its tributaries in the south. The Penzi La pass separates the two. The Suru flows north into Baltistan then joins the Indus River near  Marol. The Zanskar River flows east and debouches into the Indus River in Ladakh near a location called "Sangam".

The Suru River has two significant tributaries: Wakha Rong, which flows northwest from Namika La to join the Suru River near Kargil, and the Dras River, which originates near the Zoji La pass and joins the Suru River a short distance north of Kargil. Wakha Rong, also called the "Purik river", contains the main travel route between Kargil and Leh, and lent its name to the Kargil region itself as "Purig". The Dras River valley has historically been a subdivision called Drass.

Zanskar was a traditional Buddhist kingdom formed in the 10th century, which became subject to the Ladakhi kings.

In 2011, the Kargil tehsil, which included the Drass and Wakha Rong valleys, contained 61% of the population of the district. The Sankoo tehsil, representing the upper Suru valley, contained 10% of the population and the Zanskar tehsil contained 29% of the population.

History

Princely State of Jammu and Kashmir

In 1822, Raja Gulab Singh of the Dogra dynasty was anointed Raja of Jammu by the Sikh emperor Ranjit Singh and in 1834 sent his general Zorawar Singh Kahluria to conquer the territory between Jammu and Tibet. Marching from Kishtwar, Zorawar Singh reached Purig and defeated the Bhotia leader Mangal at Sankoo in August. Kartse, the then capital of Purig, fell into Zorawar Singh's hands, and he built a fort there before advancing towards Leh. Tshed-Pal, the Gyalpo of Leh, was defeated and reinstalled as a subsidiary of the Dogras. Meanwhile, the chief of Sod rebelled and Zorawar Singh returned to reassert his authority. Zanskar subsequently offered submission.

The Purigis rebelled repeatedly, instigated by Sikh governor Mihan Singh of Kashmir. They also received support from Ahmed Shah of Baltistan. Zorawar Singh returned in 1839 to quell the rebellion and conquered Baltistan as well.

After the conquest, the region of the present Kargil district was organised ino three ilaqas," based at Kargil, Dras and Zanskar respectively. They were headed by civil officers called Thanadars. Later, Suru was made into a separate ilaqa.

Following the First Anglo-Sikh War and the Treaty of Amritsar (1846), Gulab Singh was made an independent Maharaja of Jammu and Kashmir. The princely state of Jammu and Kashmir, as it eventually came to be called, was organised into two large provinces, Jammu and Kashmir. Ladakh and Skardu were set up as districts of the Jammu province, called wazarats. The three Purig ilaqas were included in the Skardu wazarat. Zanskar continued to be attached to Kishtwar.

In 1901, a major reorganisation of the frontier districts took place. A new Kargil tehsil was created with the three Purig ilaqas (Drass, Kargil and Suru) and, in addition, the Zanskar ilaqa from the Kishtwar district and the Kharmang ilaqa from the erstwhile Skardu district. Kargil, Leh and Skardu now made up a Ladakh wazarat, which was one of the two wazarats of the Frontier districts province. Initially, the administration of the wazarat used to spend four months each at Leh, Kargil and Skardu. But shifting the entire staff so often proved onerous, so the shifting was eventually limited to Leh and Skardu.

Post-1947

During the Indo-Pakistani War of 1947, pitched battles were fought around Kargil, and the entire area including Drass and Zoji La Pass initially coming under the control of Gilgit Scouts. By November 1948, the Indian troops reclaimed all of Kargil and Leh tehsils and portions of the Kharamang ilaqa bordering the Dras river. They remained with India after the ceasefire, forming the Ladakh district of the Jammu and Kashmir state.

During the Indo-Pakistani War of 1971 the entire Kargil region including key posts was captured by Indian troops under leadership of Col. Chewang Rinchen.

To straighten the line of control in the area, the Indian Army launched night attacks when the ground temperatures sank to below −17 °C and about 15 enemy posts located at height of 16,000 feet and more were captured. After Pakistan forces lost the war and agreed to the Shimla Agreement, Kargil and other strategic areas nearby remained with India. Kargil became a separate district in the Ladakh region during the year 1979 when it was bifurcated from the Leh district.

In the spring of 1999, under a covert plan of then -Army Chief Pervez Musharraf, armed infiltrators from Pakistan, aided by the Pakistani army, occupied vacant high-altitude posts in the Kargil and Drass regions. The result was a limited-scale conflict (Kargil War) between the two nuclear-equipped nations, which ended with India regaining the Kargil region through military power and diplomatic pressure.

In August 2019 the Parliament of India passed an act that contained provisions to make Kargil a district of the new union territory of Ladakh, which was to be formed 31 October 2019.

Climate

Kargil district is situated in the deep south-western part of the Himalayas, giving it a cool, temperate climate. The Zanskar Valley is colder. The Suru River flows through the district.

The climate is cold and temperate. The average annual temperature in Kargil is 8.6 °C. About 318 mm of precipitation falls annually. The driest month is November with 6 mm. Most precipitation falls in March, with an average of 82 mm. The warmest month of the year is July with an average temperature of 23.3 °C. In January, the average temperature is −8.8 °C. It is the lowest average temperature of the whole year. The difference in precipitation between the driest month and the wettest month is 76 mm. The average temperatures vary during the year by 32.1 °C.

Administration

The Kargil district was formed in July 1979, by separating it from Leh. Kargil has 5 Sub-Divisions, 8 tehsils, and 14 Blocks.

Sub-Divisions (5):  Drass, Kargil, Shakar-Chiktan, Sankoo,  Zanskar (Padum)

Tehsils (8): Drass, Kargil, Shakar-Chiktan, Shargole, Sankoo, Trespone (Trespone), Taisuru, Zanskar (Padum)

Blocks (14): Drass, Kargil, Shakar, Chiktan, Shargole, Sankoo, Trespone, Saliskote, Gund Mangalpore, Taisuru, Padum, Lungnaq, Cha, Zangla

Each block consists of a number of panchayats.

Politics
Kargil district had two assembly constituencies, Zanskar and Kargil under Jammu and Kashmir Legislative Assembly. It forms part of the Ladakh parliamentary constituency. Major political parties in the region include National Conference, Congress, PDP, BJP, LUTF (now merged with the BJP) and the erstwhile Kargil Alliance. The present Member of Parliament (MP) for Ladakh is Jamyang Tsering Namgyal of BJP.

Ladakh, a union territory without a legislature, does not have a legislative assembly but is represented in the Parliament.

Santosh Sukhadeve, (IAS) is the current District Development Commissioner Kargil.

Autonomous Hill Council
Kargil District is administered by an elected body known as the Ladakh Autonomous Hill Development Council, Kargil. The LAHDC-K was established in 2003.

Demographics

According to the 2011 census Kargil district has a population of 140,802. This gives it a ranking of 603rd in India (out of a total of 640). Its population growth rate over the decade 2001-2011 was 20.18%. Kargil has a sex ratio of 810 females per every 1000 males, and a literacy rate of 71.34%.

Religion
Of the total population, 77% are Muslims, of which 63% follow Shia Islam. Most of the district's Muslims are found in the north (Kargil town, Drass, and the lower Suru valley). Of the remainder, 17% of the total population practises Tibetan Buddhism and Bön, mostly found in Zanskar with small populations in the upper Suru valley (Rangdum) and around Shergol , Mulbekh and Garkhone. The remaining 8% of the population follows Hinduism and Sikhism, though as many as 95% of them are male.

Much of Kargil population is inhabited by the Purigpa and Balti people of Tibetan origin. They converted from Buddhism to Islam in the 14th century and 
 intermingled with other Aryan people. Muslims mainly inhabit the valley of Drass and speak Shina, a small number community, known as Brokpa, inhabit the Dha-Hanu region and Garkone village along the Indus River. Some Arghons and Shina have also settled in Kargil town.

Languages

The Purgi dialect of Balti is spoken by 65% while 10 percent speak Shina language in regions like Drass and Batalikis. Urdu is also spoke and understood in kargil.

Balti language has four variants/dialects and Purgi is the southern dialect of Balti language. Balti, is a branch of Archaic Western Tibetan language, is also spoken by the inhabitants of the four districts of (Baltistan) in Pakistan and Turtuk in the Nubra valley of the Leh district as well. The Buddhists of Zanskar speak Zanskari language of the Ladakhi-Balti language group.

Culture

Though earlier Tibetan contact has left a profound influence upon the people of both Kargil and Leh, after the spread of Shia Islam the people of Kargil were heavily influenced by Persian culture. This is apparent by the use of Persian words and phrases as well as in songs called marsias and qasidas. At least until recently, some Kargilis, especially those of the Agha families (descendants of Syed preachers who were in a direct line descent from the Islamic prophet, Muhammad) went to Iraq for their education. Native Ladakhis go for higher Islamic studies in seminaries in Najaf, Iraq and Qom in Iran. These non-Agah scholars are popularly called as "Sheikh". Some among the most prominent religious scholars include Imam-e-Jummah, Sheikh Mussa Shariefi, Sheikh Ahmed Mohammadi, Sheikh Hussain Zakiri and Sheikh Anwar.

Social ceremonies such as marriages still carry many customs and rituals that are common to both the Muslims and Buddhists. Among the two districts of Ladakh, Kargil has a more mixed ethnic population and thus there are more regional dialects spoken in Kargil as compared to Leh. Local folk songs, which are called rgya-glu and balti ghazals, are still quite popular and are performed enthusiastically at social gatherings.

Wildlife

Endangered species
Kargil is home to many endangered wildlife species:
 Snow leopard (Panthera uncia)
 Tibetan wolf (Canis lupus langier)
 Himalayan brown bear (Ursus arctos isabellinus)
 Asiatic ibex (Capra ibex)
 Ladakh urial (Ovis vignei vignei)
 musk deer (Moschus spp.)
 pikas
 marmots and hares. 

Some of the reptiles found in Kargil district are
 Platyceps ladacensis (Ladakh cliff racer) 
 Phrynocephalus theobaldi (toad head agama)
 Altiphylax stoliczkai (Balti gecko)
 Paralaudakia himalayana (Himalayan agama) 
 Asymblepharus ladacensis (Ladakh ground skink). 

Aishwarya Maheshwari of the World Wildlife Fund (WWF) is quoted as saying, "It is here in Kargil that one of world's most elusive creatures, the snow leopard, roams wild and free. During my research I have learnt about the tremendous decline in wildlife sightings since the 1999 Kargil war, so much so that even the common resident birds had disappeared."

Birds
Besides the endangered species, various birds are commonly seen in summer: 
 Black-necked Eurasian magpie
 house sparrow
 hoopoe
 rosefinches
 red-billed choughs
 eastern chiffchaff
 common sandpiper
 European goldfinches.

Gallery

Transportation
National Highway 1D, connecting Srinagar to Leh, passes through Kargil. This highway is typically open for traffic only from May to December due to heavy snowfall at the Zoji La. There is a partially paved road leading from Kargil south to Zanskar, which is also only open only from June to September. India and Pakistan have both considered linking the Pakistani town of Skardu to Kargil with a bus route to reunite the Ladakh families separated by the line of control since 1972.

Road
Kargil is connected to the rest of India by one high-altitude road which is subject to landslides and is impassable in winter due to deep snows. The National Highway 1D connects Kargil to Srinagar. The NH 301 connects Kargil with the remote Zanskar region. Upgradation of this road is going on to reduce the time travel between Kargil and Padum, tehsil headquarters of Zanskar region.

Nimmu–Padam–Darcha road
This is the third road axis to Leh through Zanskar in Kargil district. It is currently under construction.

Air
Kargil Airport is a non-operational airport used only for defence purposes by the Indian Air Force. Kargil Airport has been included under Central Govt.'s UDAN scheme for commercial operations. The nearest operational airport is Leh's Kushok Bakula Rimpochee Airport which is located 215 kilometres from Kargil.

Rail
There is no railway service currently in Ladakh, however, 2 railway routes are proposed- the Bhanupli–Leh line and Srinagar–Kargil–Leh line.

See also

 List of districts of Ladakh
 Geography of Ladakh
 Tourism in Ladakh
 Ladakh Autonomous Hill Development Council, Kargil

Notes

References

Bibliography
 
 
 
 
 
 
 
 Ghulam Mohiuddin Dar. Kargil: Its social, culture, and economic history.
 Kargil : The Important Trade Transit of Yesteryears, People & Society
Shireen M. Mazari, The Kargil Conflict, 1999: Separating Fact from Fiction, The Institute of Strategic Studies, Islamabad  (2003)

External links

 Rivers of Kargil district on OpenStreetMap: Dras, Suru and Kartse, Wakha, Zanskar
Ladakh Autonomous Hill Development Council, Kargil
Kargil Tehsil Map, MapsofIndia.com
 "Pakistan's Northern Areas dilemma", BBC
Kargil War 1999, Rediff

 
Autonomous regions of India
1979 establishments in Jammu and Kashmir
States and territories established in 1995
 
Geography of Ladakh
Districts of Ladakh